The 2002–03 Umaglesi Liga was the fourteenth season of top-tier football in Georgia. It began on 3 August 2002 and ended on 30 May 2003. Torpedo Kutaisi were the defending champions.

Locations

First stage

League table

Results

Second stage

Championship group

Table

Results

Relegation group

Table

Results

Relegation play-offs

Top goalscorers

See also

2002–03 Georgian Cup

References
Georgia - List of final tables (RSSSF)

Erovnuli Liga seasons
1
Georgia